The Wu Chinese people, also known as Wuyue people, Jiang-Zhe people or San Kiang, are a major subgroup of the Han Chinese. They are a Wu Chinese-speaking people who hail from Southern Jiangsu Province, the entirety of the city of Shanghai and all of Zhejiang Province, as well as smaller populations in Xuancheng prefecture-level city in Southern Anhui Province, Shangrao, Guangfeng and Yushan counties of Northeastern Jiangxi Province and some parts of Pucheng County in Northern Fujian Province.

History

Origins

For much of its history and prehistory, the Wuyue region has been home to several neolithic cultures such as the Hemudu culture, Majiabang culture and the Liangzhu culture. Both Wu and Yue were two kingdoms during the Zhou dynasty and many such allusions to those kingdoms were attributed in the Spring and Autumn Annals, the Zuo Zhuan and the Guoyu. Later, after years of fighting and conflict, the two cultures of Wu and Yue became one culture through mutual contact and cultural diffusion. The Chu state from the west (in Hubei) expanded into this area and defeated the Yue state.

After Chu was conquered by Qin, China was unified. It was not until the fall of Western Jin during the early 4th century AD that northern Chinese moved to Jiangnan in significant numbers. The Yellow River valley was becoming barren due to flooding, lack of trees after intensive logging to create farmland and constant harassment and invasion by the Wu Hu nomads.

In the 10th century, Wuyue (Ten Kingdoms) was a small coastal kingdom founded by Qian Liu who made a lasting cultural impact on Jiangnan and its people to this day. The cultural distinctiveness that began developing over this period persists to this day as the Wuyue region speaks a branch of the Chinese language called Wu (the most famous dialect of which is Shanghainese), has distinctive cuisine and other cultural traits.

There have been many periods of mass-migrations to Wuyue areas from Northern China, sometimes overtaking the local Wuyue population. One notable example of this was when the Song dynasty fell in the north, large numbers of northern refugees flooded into the relocated capital Hangzhou mainly from the areas that are currently under the administration of modern-day Henan Province. Within just 30 years, contemporary accounts record that these Northern immigrants outnumbered the Wu natives of Hangzhou, altering the city's spoken dialect and culture.

Subgroups
Shanghainese people
Wenzhou people

Culture

Education
Traditionally, in the past, Wuyue people dominated the imperial examinations and were often ranked first in the imperial examinations as Zhuangyuan, or in other positions of the Jinshi degree. The Wu speaking region produced 59 out of 114 Zhuangyuan scholars during the Ming and Qing dynasty, and 10427 out of 51444 Jinshi scholars, despite currently only constituting 6% of China's population. Amongst the 2331 scholars promoted to the Chinese Academy of Science and Chinese Academy of Engineering since the institutions' establishment from 1955, over 30% are Wuyue people, with 450 are from Jiangsu, 375 are from Zhejiang, 84 are from Shanghai. In addition, 5 out of 12 Nobel laureates who are of Chinese descent are Wuyue people, including Tsung Dao Lee, Charles Kao, Steven Chu, Roger Tsien and Youyou Tu.

Languages

Changzhou dialect
Hangzhou dialect
Huzhou dialect
Jinhua dialect
Ningbo dialect
Shanghainese dialect
Shaoxing dialect
Suzhou dialect
Wenzhounese dialect
Wuxi dialect

Music
Jiangnan sizhu 
Suzhou Pingtan (originated from Suzhou)

Opera

Kunqu and Yue opera are amongst the most popular form of traditional opera in China, second to Peking Opera only.
Kunqu
Yue opera
Shanghai opera
Yongju, or Ningbo opera

Literature
Wo Bau-Sae
Butterfly Lovers
Legend of the White Snake
Dream of the Red Chamber

Philosophy and Religion
Yangming school of Neo-Confucianism
Tiantai school of Mahayana Buddhism

Architecture Heritage Sites
Tianyi Chamber
The Classical Gardens in Suzhou

Cultural Items
Silk, Jiangnan is the largest silk-producing region in China. Huzhou is known for its fine silk.
Tea (Camellia sinensis), Hangzhou is known for its Longjing tea, and the rest of Jiangnan has their own unique tea varieties.
Suzhou embroidery
Shaoxing wine

DNA Analysis
The HLA-DRB1 distribution of Jiangsu-Zhejiang-Shanghai Han population does share genetic characteristics with other Han Chinese populations, but it also exhibits its own characteristics distinct from that of other Han Chinese populations. This study also suggests that Wu-speaking peoples genetically, bridge the gap between Northern Han and Southern Han populations and thus are an intermediate between both populations. Even though Wu-speaking peoples form a genetic cluster, DNA analyses also show that Wu-speaking peoples are genetically coherent with other Han Chinese populations.

Notable Wu Chinese speakers

Scientists and inventors
 
Shen Kuo (1031–1095), a brilliant polymathic scientist and mathematician of the Song dynasty.
Xu Guangqi (1562–1633), Chinese mathematician, agricultural scientist, astronomer, and scholar-bureaucrat under the Ming dynasty.
Wang Ganchang (1907–1998), one of the founding fathers of Chinese nuclear physics, cosmic rays and particle physics.
Tan Jiazhen (1909–2008), Chinese geneticist and the main founder of modern Chinese genetics.
Qian Xuesen (1911–2009), the father of Chinese space program, Qian was praised by Theodore von Kármán who said that Qian "answered my questions with unusual precision. I was immediately impressed with the keenness and quickness of his (Qian's) mind."
Chien-Shiung Wu (1912–1997), an experimental physicist, she was known as "the First Lady of Physics" for her contributions to nuclear physics and was the first recipient of the Wolf Prize in Physics.
Chien Wei-zang (1912–2010), an applied mathematician and physicist.
He Zehui (1914–2011), a Chinese nuclear physicist who worked to develop and exploit nuclear physics in China.
Shao Xianghua (1913–2012), Chinese scientist and metallurgical engineer. He was considered as a pioneer of modern Chinese metallurgical engineering.
Tsung-Dao Lee (1926–), Nobel prize laureate in Physics (1956).
Li Zhijian (1928–2011), the pioneer of Chinese microelectronics.
Tu Youyou (1930–), Nobel prize laureate in Physiology or Medicine (2015).
Charles K. Kao (1933–), Nobel prize laureate in Physics (2009).
Ni Guangjiong (1934–), Chinese physicist and science writer.
Gu Leguan (1935–2001), a Chinese physicist and educator, he was also the former president of Chongqing University.
Li Sanli (1935–), one of China's pioneers in computer science and engineering. He has won many domestic awards for research in the fields of computer architecture and organization.
Zhou Chaochen (1937–), Chinese computer scientist and inventor of the Duration calculus.
Andrew Yao (1946–), a Chinese computer scientist and computational theorist. His contributions include proving what is now known as Yao's Principle.
Ho-Kwang Mao (1947–), an eminent scientist and geologist in America.
Jiawei Han, (1949–), Chinese computer scientist and Abel Bliss Professor in the Department of Computer Science at the University of Illinois at Urbana-Champaign.
Roger Y. Tsien (1952–2016), Nobel prize laureate in Chemistry (2009), Tsien was praised for being immensely intelligent by Herman Quirmbach who said "It's probably not an exaggeration to say he(Roger Y. Tsien)'s the smartest person I ever met... [a]nd I have met a lot of brilliant people".
Junying Yu (1975–), is a stem cell biologist and researcher at the University of Wisconsin–Madison.

Mathematicians
 
Shen Kuo (1031–1095), a brilliant polymathic mathematician and scientist of the Song dynasty, he created an approximation of the arc of a circle s by s = c + 2v2/d, where d is the diameter, v is the versine, c is the length of the chord c subtending the arc.
Xu Guangqi (1562–1633), Chinese mathematician,  agricultural scientist, astronomer and scholar-bureaucrat under the Ming dynasty.
Pan Lei (1646 – 1708) was a Qing dynasty scholar and mathematician. 
Li Rui (1768–1817), independently invented Descartes' rule of signs during the Qing dynasty.
Li Shanlan (1810 – 1882), invented the Li Shanlan's Summation Formulae, he also coined a great number of mathematical terms used in Chinese today.
Hu Dunfu (1886–1978), Chinese mathematician and pioneer in higher education, he was the first dean of Tsinghua University.
Jiang Lifu (1890–1978), father of modern Chinese mathematics and the first president of Academia Sinica of Mathematics.
Chen Jiangong (1893–1971), an educator, mathematician and pioneer of modernizing Chinese mathematics
Pao-Lu Hsu (1910–1970), a famed mathematician for being the father of probability and statistics in China.
Hua Luogeng (1910–1985), famous for his important contributions to number theory and for his role as the leader of mathematics research and education in the People's Republic of China. 
Shiing-Shen Chern (1911–2004), one of the greatest mathematicians of the twentieth century and widely regarded as a leader in geometry and winning many prizes for his immense number of contributions to mathematics.
Ky Fan (1914–2010), famous mathematician who invented many new mathematical equations and theories.
Wu Wenjun (1919–2017), Chinese mathematician.
Wang Yuan (mathematician) (1930–),  head of the Institute of Mathematics, Chinese Academy of Sciences..
Pan Chengdong (1934–1997), mathematician and vice president of Shandong University.
Weinan E (1963–), applied mathematician who made many achievements in mathematics by contributing new equations into homogenization theory, theoretical models of turbulence, electronic structure analysis, multiscale methods, computational fluid dynamics, and weak KAM theory.
Zhiwei Yun (1982–), received a gold medal with a perfect score on his first time participating, and was awarded the SASTRA Ramanujan Prize in 2012 for his "fundamental contributions to several areas that lie at the interface of representation theory, algebraic geometry and number theory".

Philosophers

Wang Chong (Shaoxing), Han dynasty philosopher.
Zhu Xi (Huizhou region), founder of Neo-Confucianism, Song dynasty philosopher.
Wang Yangming (Ningbo), regarded as one of the four greatest Confucianist philosophers.
Qian Dehong (Ningbo),  philosopher, writer, and educator during the mid-late Ming dynasty.
Pan Pingge (Ningbo), Ming era critic of Neo-Confucianism.
Huang Zongxi (Ningbo), naturalist and political theorist, he advocated the belief that ministers should be openly critical of their emperor.
Wang Maozu (Suzhou), Republic era philosopher and educationalist.
Ch'ien Mu (Wuxi), Chinese philosopher, historian, educator and Confucian. He was honored as one of the "Four Greatest Historians" of Modern China.

Writers

Zhang Rong (443–497) was a Chinese official and poet during the period of the Southern and Northern Dynasties.
Lu Guimeng (before 836–881), Tang dynasty Chinese poet.
Lu You (1125–1209), patriotic poet of the Southern Song dynasty.
Shi Nai'an (1296–1372), author of the Water Margin, one of the Four Great Classical Novels.
Qian Qianyi (1582–1664), a Chinese official, scholar and social historian of the late Ming dynasty.
Shao Mi (1592-1642) a Chinese landscape painter, calligrapher, and poet during the Ming dynasty.
Zhang Dai (1597–1679), Ming writer, historian and biographer.
Wu Weiye (1609–1671) was an author and poet in Classical Chinese poetry.
Lu Xun (1881–1936), a leading figure of modern Chinese literature.
Liu Bannong (1891–1934), a Chinese linguist and poet.
Gu Jiegang (1893–1980), a Chinese historian best known for his seven-volume work Gushi Bian (古史辨, or Debates on Ancient History). He was a co-founder and the leading force of the Doubting Antiquity School, and was highly influential in the 20th century development of Chinese history.
Ai Qing (1910–1996), regarded as one of the finest modern Chinese poets.
Fei Xiaotong  (1910–2005), a pioneering Chinese researcher and professor of sociology and anthropology.
Qian Zhongshu (1910–1998), a Chinese literary scholar and writer, known for his wit and erudition.
Eileen Chang (1920–1995), one of the most influential modern Chinese writers, it was stated by poet and University of Southern California professor Dominic Cheung that "had it not been for the political division between the Nationalist and Communist Chinese, she (Eileen Chang) would have almost certainly won a Nobel Prize".
Gao Xingjian (1940–), novelist, playwright, critic and the Nobel prize laureate for Literature of 2000.
Ye Wenling (1942–), Chinese novelist and politician.
Xiaolu Guo (1973–), novelist and filmmaker, her novels have been translated into 27 languages. In 2013 she was named as one of Granta's Best of Young British Novelists, a list drawn up once a decade.

Kings and politicians

Qian Liu (852–932), founder and first king of Wuyue.
Qian Yuanguan (887–941), second king of Wuyue.
Sun Baoqi (1867–1931), the Qing governor of Shandong Province and the premier of the Republic of China.
Chiang Kai-shek (1887–1975), President of the Republic of China in China and Taiwan.
Chiang Ching-kuo (1910–1988), President of Republic of China (Taiwan).
Sang Guowei (1941–), former chairman of the Chinese Peasants' and Workers' Democratic Party.

See also
 Wuyue
 Chinese people
 Wu (region)
 Subei people

References

External links
 wenlian.xiaoshan.gov.cn 

Subgroups of the Han Chinese
Wu (region)